FrightFest, also known as Arrow Video FrightFest is an annual film festival held in London and Glasgow. The festival holds three major events each year: a festival running five days over the UK late August Bank Holiday weekend, a Halloween event held in London in late October, and a festival in Glasgow held around February as part of the Glasgow Film Festival.

The first event was held in London in 2000 and the first Glasgow festival was held in 2006. As its name indicates FrightFest primary focus is on the horror film genre, however, the event regularly features documentaries, science fiction and thriller films.

History
Paul McEvoy has stated that his initial idea for FrightFest "came from my love and admiration for the seminal 'Shock Around The Clock' events of the 1980s organised by Stefan Jaworszyn and Alan Jones." He then reached out to Ian Rattray, journalist Alan Jones, film and television PR person and Greg Day, with whom he founded and ran the event. Question and Answer sessions are also compered by them.

For five years the festival was held at the Prince Charles Cinema (PCC). In 2005, it moved to the Odeon West End (OWE) due to increasing audiences. In 2009, it found a new home in Empire, Leicester Square. Various one-off events have been held at venues across the UK. The Fright Fest brand has been included in the Cambridge Film Festival and the Glasgow Film Festival.

The Festival has been host to many personal appearances by those involved with the making of the films being shown. Notable attendees include George A. Romero, Rob Zombie, Paul W. S. Anderson, Park Chan-wook, Danny Boyle, Guillermo del Toro (twice), Brian Yuzna, Neil Marshall, Uwe Boll, John Landis, Don Mancini, Barbara Crampton (twice), Kane Hodder, Gaspar Noé, Richard Brake, Adam Green, and Tobe Hooper.

FrightFest has had a number of different sponsors over the span of its life, including the Horror Channel, Film4, Volkswagen Lupo, Bizarre magazine (of which the August issue was given away free), Xfm, Zone Horror and Play.com.

Poster and logo designs are provided by the artist Graham Humphreys.

London Festival Line-ups
The following is a listing of each film and shorts (and previews) shown at the festival each year.

FF2000 
The first FrightFest was held for four days from Friday 25 through Monday 28 August 2000 at the Prince Charles Cinema in Soho, London.

Films shown at the inaugural FrightFest were Lighthouse,  Ed Gein, Freeway II: Confessions of a Trickbaby, Dario Argento's The Phantom of the Opera, Christina's House, Scary Movie, Pitch Black, Blood, Guts, Bullets and Octane, Ringu 2, Blood, The Criminal, Anatomie, Mario Bava: Maestro of the Macabre, Dario Agento an eye for horror, The 13th Sign, Audition, and Cut.

The short films Purgatory and In Memory of Laura were also shown.

FF2001 
The second FrightFest was again held at the Prince Charles Cinema, where it screened The Devil's Backbone prior to its screenings in the United States and Canada. The film received a positive reception, prompting director Guillermo Del Toro to dub the festival “the Woodstock of gore”.

Films shown were The Bunker, Revelation, Kiss of the Dragon, Cubbyhouse, Sleepless, Scary Movie 2, The Devil's Backbone, The Texas Chainsaw Massacre 2, Cradle of Fear, Dust, Brotherhood of the Wolf, Battle Royale, Alone, The Isle, Ginger Snaps, and Jeepers Creepers.

An episode of the television series Urban Gothic and the short films The Window and Universal were also screened.

FF2002
The third year of the London FrightFest was held again at the PCC, where the front rows became available to weekend passholders for the first time. Director Danny Boyle screened the first reel of 28 Days Later and Paul W. S. Anderson and producer Jeremy Bolt appeared to show a promo for Resident Evil.

Films screened at the festival were Nine Lives, Frailty, The Princess Blade, Donnie Darko, The Eye, Halloween: Resurrection, One Hour Photo, My Little Eye, Swimfan, Tuno Negro, Dark Water, Spider, The Happiness of the Katakuris, Bloody Mallory, Insomnia, and Ted Bundy. The short films for this event were Pissboy', The Cicerones, and Whacked.

 FF2003 
The fourth FrightFest was held at the PCC. The films screened at the event were Octane, The League of Extraordinary Gentlemen, Beyond Re-Animator, Tattoo, Malefique, Cypher, Jeepers Creepers 2, Charlie's Family, Dracula: Pages from a Virgin's Diary, Phone, The Last Horror Movie, Gozu, Cabin Fever, House of the Dead, Between Your Legs, Fear X, and House of 1000 Corpses. In attendance were directors Marcus Adams, Eric Valette, Julian Richards, and Rob Zombie.

The short films that were screened were Virus, Suspended, and The Last Dream. The festival also screened "Trailer Trash", a compilation of rare and odd trailers.

 FF2004 
The fifth FrightFest marked the final year that the event would be held at the PCC. This was also the first year the short movies were shown in one block and had an earlier start time for Saturday through Monday. Directors and producers who presented at the event included Park Chan-wook, Alexandre Aja and actress Cécile de France, Paco Plaza and Brian Yuzna, John Fawcett and Paula Devonshire, Hamish McAlpine, Brad Anderson, and Christopher Smith and actress Franka Potente. Smith and Potente held a Q&A session after the film. Guillermo del Toro was also present to screen his film Hellboy alongside actors Ron Perlman, Selma Blair, and Rupert Evans, who similarly held a Q&A session after the film.

Films shown at the event were Oldboy, Haute Tension, Toolbox Murders, Profondo Rosso, The Tesseract, Romasanta: The Werewolf Hunt, The I Inside, Hellboy, Monster Man, The Card Player, Buppah Rahtree, Code 46, Calvaire, Ginger Snaps Back: The Beginning, The Eye 2, One Point 0, The Hillside Strangler, Casshern, The Machinist, and Creep.

The Short Film Showcase screened Rex Steele Nazi Smasher, Oltro Ladrillo En La Pared (Another Brick in the Wall), La Guarida Del Ermitano (In The Hermits Lair), L'Autre (The Other), and Amor So De Mae (Love from Mother Only). The event Trailer Trash was not present this year, but was replaced with the second reel of Alien vs. Predator. Don Mancini screened a rough cut trailer for Seed of Chucky.

 FF2005 

In its sixth year FrightFest moved to Screen One of the Odeon West End. Another change from the prior festivals was that this year the festival started early on Friday morning. This was to support the opening movie Land of the Dead by screening the three preceding ...of the Dead movies. Gregory Nicotero made an appearance and displayed zombie props used in the making of the movies, after which director George A. Romero presented Land of the Dead. Others that presented their films at the festival included Jake West, Conor McMahon, Carl Daft, Samantha Shields and Nicola Muldoon, Ti West, David McGillivray, Paul Spurrier, Christian Alvart, and Greg McLean with Cassandra Magrath and Kestie Morassi. This year also saw the creation of Alan Jones' FrightFest Year Book. The book is a retrospective of genre films of that year and included an opening chapter concerned itself with the Fest itself. The book was published through Revolver Books in 2006.

Films screened at this year's festival were Night of the Living Dead, Dawn of the Dead, Day of the Dead, Land of the Dead, A Bittersweet Life, Evil Aliens, Do You Like Hitchcock?, Dead Meat, Ban the Sadist Videos, The Neighbour No. 13, Wild Country, The Collingswood Story, Marebito, Red Eye, Night Watch, Dominion: Prequel to the Exorcist, The Roost, 2001 Maniacs, Born to Fight, Day of the Dead 2: Contagium, P, Antikörper, and Wolf Creek.

This year's shorts were not screened in a block as with the prior year. The short films screened were The Eel, The Ten Steps, The Victim, and Mrs Davenport's Throat.

 FF2006
For its seventh year FrightFest began screening its films on Screen Two due to the increase of attendees. The festival brochure/programme expanded too with an original comic strip (Intermission by John-Paul Kamath of London Horror Comic) and an original short story by author/critic Kim Newman.  Dave Andrew composed music for FrightFest, which played between movies and a FrightFest exclusive trailer for Hot Fuzz was presented by Edgar Wright. This year also marked the return of the Trailer Trash event.

A charity screening Severance was held as the opening event to the festival with the proceeds going to the Teenage Cancer Trust. Director Christopher Smith and screenwriter James Moran presented the movie. Guillermo del Toro and Alfonse Cuarón were also present at the festival for the UK premiere of Pan's Labyrinth, which occurred after an afternoon Hammer retrospective. Other presenters at the festival included Adam Green, Billy O'Brien, Jordan Baker, Adam Mason, Simon Rumley, Mark Duffied, Hadi Hajaig, David Soul, and Nick Moran.

Additional films screened at the festival were The Hound of the Baskervilles, Countess Dracula, Twins of Evil, Hatchet, Frostbiten, Isolation, Earthlings Ugly Bags of Mostly Water, See No Evil, Open Water 2: Adrift, Snoop Dogg's Hood of Horror, Broken, The Living and the Dead, Ils, Grimm Love, The Lost, Sheitan, H6: Diary of a Serial Killer, Ghost of Mae Nak, Puritan, Behind the Mask: The Rise of Leslie Vernon, and The Host.

Short films screened at the festival were Gasoline Blood, In the Place of the Dead, Out of the Darkness, snatching time, Missed Call and Deadly Tantrum. The festival hosted the CUT! competition short film showcase, which was made up of  Hammer Falls, Torn Flesh, The Silent Scream, Natural Birthing, A Very Grimm Fairytale, The Collector, Curta Veraso, The Fall Down, Dead Wood, and Kasting.

This year also marked the first Frightfest Halloween All-Nighter, which would be traditionally held on 30 October of each year.

FF2007
The eighth FrightFest opened on Thursday, 24 August 2007 and ran until 27 August. It was held in Leicester Square and was sponsored by Film4. It was organized by Alan Jones, Ian Rattray, and Paul McEvoy. On the festival's final day FrightFest supported an attempt to break the Zombie Walk record to tie in with the showing of The Zombie Diaries. The walk was unsuccessful in breaking the record, falling short of the then current record held by a zombie walk held in Pittsburgh, Pennsylvania.

Presenters at the event included Andrew Macdonald, Neil Marshall,  Mikael Håfström, Paddy Breathnach, Roar Uthaug,   Joe Lynch, Kit Ryan, Chris Stapp and Matt Heath, Jonathan King, Tom Shankland and Clive Bradley, Juan Antonio Bayona and Sergio G. Sánchez, Adam Green, Mike Williamson, and Rigoberto Castañeda. Uwe Boll hosted a double bill with a Q&A session while Adam Green and Alan Jones conducted a live commentary for Hatchet. Reece Shearsmith and other cast and crew previewed footage from their film The Cottage and Emily Booth introduced a grindhouse trailers documentary.

Films presented at the event were Black Sheep, Black Water, Hatchet, The Sword Bearer, The Signal, 1408, Teeth, All the Boys Love Mandy Lane, Shrooms, Fritt Vilt, Joshua, Storm Warning, Wrong Turn 2, Disturbia, The Devil Dared Me To, Jack Ketchum's The Girl Next Door, The Zombie Diaries, Kilometer 31, Spiral, Botched, WΔZ,  Postal, Seed, Skinwalkers, and Dnevnoy dozor. Other footage shown at the festival was the screening of extra features from the 28 Weeks Later, Doomsday preview footage, and a Don't fake trailer from Grindhouse.

The short film The Bride was screened at the festival and on Saturday the Short Film Showcase was made up of the films We're Ready for you now, Dead @17, The Dear Hunter, Pig Tale, and Little Brats. FrightFest Xtra a one-day event held at The Phoenix Cinema, East Finchley on the following Saturday and presented Santo in the Wax Museum, Espectro, and Mr. Brooks.

FF2008
The ninth FrightFest was held from 21 through 25 August 2008 and was once again sponsored by Film4. It would also be the last year that it would be held at Odeon West End and that that FrightFest 2009 would move to the Empire in Leicester Square. This year's programme featured artwork by Graham Humphreys and weekend passes for the event sold out on the first day of sales. The festival's opening film was Eden Lake, which was presented by James Watkins and actors Michael Fassbender and Jack O'Connell. Directors Adam Green and Joe Lynch were also present at the festival as "The Douche Brothers" and provided 5 short movies depicting their fictional journey to FrightFest 2008, each of which played before the day's early evening movie. The opening reel of Book of Blood was shown, as were trailers for Grace and the Friday the 13th remake. Preview footage was shown for Into the Dark: Exploring the Horror Film, Dead Set, and Lesbian Vampire Killers. The footage was presented by Paul McEvoy, Charlie Brooker, and MyAnna Buring, respectively.

Other presenters at the event included Stacey Edmonds and Doug Turner, Steven Goldman, Perry Benson, Dido Miles, Ainsley Howard, Steven Shiel, Amanda Martin, Paddy Breathnach, Andrew-Lee Potts, Frank Henenlotter, Charlee Danielson, Anthony Sneed, Gregg Bishop, Patrick Syversen and Nini Bull Robsahm, Joey Evans, Chris Daly, Bradley Maroney, Audrey Elizabeth Evans, John Ajvide Lindqvist, Pascal Laugier, Adam Green, Adam Gierasch and Jace Anderson, Trevor Matthews, Johnny Kevorkian, Kerry Anne Mullaney, and Kris Bird.

The films screened at the film festival were Eden Lake, I Know How Many Runs You Scored Last Summer, Scar-3D, Time Crimes, King of the Hill, Trailer Park of Terror, Mum & Dad, The Strangers, Freakdog, Bad Biology, Fear(s) of the Dark, Dance of the Dead, Manhunt, The Chaser, The Midnight Meat Train, Tokyo Gore Police, Bubba's Chili Parlor, From Within, Let the Right One In, Autopsy, Martyrs, Jack Brooks Monster Slayer, The Dead Outside, The Disappeared, Mirrors, and Death Race.

Other FrightFest events included  the Zone Horror Cut short movie competition and the Film4 FrightFest short film showcase. The short films in the showcase were The Chest, The Amazing Trousers, Homework, is anyone there, Psycho Hillbilly Massacre, and Total Fury. Other short films shown at the festival were The Listening Dead and Left Turn, and Norman J. Warren introduced a separate compendium of shorts.

 October event 
An all-night Halloween film festival was shown on 30 October 2008. Films shown at the event were Gnaw, Hush, Book Of Blood, Treevenge,  My Name Is Bruce, The Children, Langliena: Una Storia Macabra, Escape From New York, Splinter, and Pig Hunt.

FF2009
FrightFest 2009 ran from 27 to 31 August and was held at its new venue, the Empire in Leicester Square. This tenth incarnation of the festival marked the first time the festival took place on two screens, a "Main Screen" for the major films of the festival and the "Discovery Screen" for some smaller entries which are repeated during the festival. John Landis was in attendance over the weekend and also introduced the screening of An American Werewolf in London. Joe Lynch and Adam Green returned as "The Douche Brothers" and screened the short "The Road to Frightfest" films they had created for last year's festival.

Films shown on the main screen were Triangle, The Hills Run Red, Infestation, The Horseman, Beware The Moon, An American Werewolf in London - Remastered, Shadow, La Horde, Macabre, Smash Cut, Hierro, The Girl with the Dragon Tattoo, Giallo, Trick 'r Treat, Vampire Girl vs. Frankenstein Girl, Dead Snow, The Human Centipede (First Sequence), Coffin Rock, Night of the Demons, Clive Barker's Dread, Zombie Women of Satan, The House of the Devil, Case 39, Heartless, and The Descent Part 2. The short films Deadwalkers, Paris By Night of the Living Dead, and Sad Case were also hosted on this screen.

Films shown on the discovery screen were Best Worst Movie, I Sell the Dead, I Think We're Alone Now, Colin, Black, Evil Things, Fragment, It's Alive, and Pontypool. The discovery screen also hosted 'The Horror of Writing' Competition.

 October event 
An all-night Halloween film festival was shown at the Empire Cinema on 30 October 2009. Films shown at the event were Umbrage, George A Romero's Survival Of The Dead, Paranormal Activity, Wrong Turn 3: Left For Dead, Jennifer's Body, and Carriers. FF2010 
The eleventh Frightfest ran from 26–30 August 2010 and was held at the Empire cinema, Leicester Square. As with the prior year, the festival showed its offerings on two screens, the "Main Screen" and "Discovery Screen". This year introduced the Total Icons stand of films, sponsored by Total Film. Two films were pulled from the festival, the controversial A Serbian Film and Gregg Araki's Kaboom, the latter of which was pulled by the director himself. Screening A Serbian Film would have required that the organizers screen a heavily censored version approved by the British Board of Film Classification and Westminster council, which they were unwilling to do as "a film of this nature should be shown in its entirety". Director Tobe Hooper was in attendance and hosted a Q&A on the main screen as part of  Total Icons.

Films shown on the main screen were Hatchet II, Primal, Dead Cert,  Eggshells, The Texas Chainsaw Massacre, Isle of Dogs, F, Red Hill, Alien vs Ninja, Cherry Tree Lane, The Tortured, 13Hrs, I Spit on Your Grave, Monsters, Dream Home, The Pack, We Are What We Are, Damned by Dawn, Buried, The Loved Ones, Video Nasties: Moral Panic, Censorship & Videotape, The Dead, Bedevilled, Red White & Blue, and The Last Exorcism. The Film 4 FrightFest international short film showcase was also held on the main screen, as was a quiz run by Andy Nyman.

Films shown on the discovery screen were Burning Bright, The Clinic, Finalé, Wound, Outcast, Higanjima: Escape from Vampire Island, Christopher Roth, Fanboys, After.Life, Amer, and After.Life.

 October event 
An all-night Halloween film festival was shown at the Empire Cinema on 30 October 2010. Films shown at the event were Confessions, Altitude, The Silent House, Choose, and Rare Exports: A Christmas Tale.

FF2011
The twelfth FrightFest took place from 25 to 19 August 2011 at the Empire, Leicester Square. The opening film of the festival was Don't Be Afraid of the Dark and the closing film was A Lonely Place to Die. The Total Film Total Icon interview this year was with film producer Larry Fessenden. The festival also featured a showing of The Dead with live audio commentary by directors Howard J. Ford and John Ford, as well as five new short films paying tribute to the films of John Carpenter, each from a different director. The directors and their films were Jake West/Escape From New York, Sean Hogan/The Thing, James Moran/Halloween, Marc Price/They Live, and Ben Wheatley/Assault on Precinct 13.

Films shown on the main screen were Don't Be Afraid of the Dark, Final Destination 5, The Theatre Bizarre, Rogue River, The Holding, Urban Explorers, The Glass Man, Tucker & Dale vs Evil, Vile, The Troll Hunter, The Wicker Tree, Panic Button, Fright Night, The Woman, Chillerama, The Divide, The Innkeepers, Sint, Kill List, Detention, A Night In The Woods, Deadheads, Sennentuntschi: Curse Of the Alps, Inbred, and A Lonely Place to Die.

The Short Film Showcase and Andy Nyman's Quiz From Hell were also featured on the main screen.

Films shown on the discovery screen were The Man Who Saw Frankenstein Cry, A Horrible Way To Die, Midnight Son, Rabies, Blood Runs Cold, Kidnapped, Stormhouse, The Dead, Atrocious, My Sucky Teen Romance, The Caller, and The Devil's Business.

 October event 
A second event, an all-night Halloween film festival, was held on 29 October 2011. A second showing of the films, excluding Julien Maury and Alexandre Bustillo’s Livid, was held on 4 November 2011. The films shown were The Human Centipede II (Full Sequence), Bad Meat, Faces in the Crowd, Livid, Cold Sweat, and The Watermen.

FF2012
This year's festival was named "Film4 FrightFest The 13th" and took place at The Empire, Leicester Square from 23 to 27 August 2012. This festival marked the first time that FrightFest's offerings would be shown on three screens, as the organizers offered a third "re-discovery screen", where attendees could watch remastered classic films. Another new addition was the introduction of the Variety Award, which would be presented by actor Simon Pegg to Gregory Nicotero for his work in the special effects field.

The festival was opened with Paul Hyett's The Seasoning House and closed with Tower Block, the directorial debut of James Nunn and Ronnie Thompson. It also hosted the UK premiere of REC 3: Genesis. This year's Total Film Total Icon interview was with Dario Argento, which was hosted on the main screen.

Films shown on the main screen were The Seasoning House, Cockneys Vs Zombies, Grabbers, Nightbreed The Cabal Cut, Hidden in the Woods (original version), V/H/S, REC 3: Genesis, Stitches, Eurocrime! The Italian Cop and Gangster Films That Ruled the '70s, Outpost: Black Sun, Paura 3D, Under The Bed, Tulpa, Maniac, The Thompsons, Sleep Tight, Berberian Sound Studio, Sinister, Dead Sushi, American Mary, After, Chained, The Possession, and Tower Block. Also shown on the main screen were the Short Films Showcase, the Total Icon interview, and Andy Nyman's Quiz From Hell.

Films shown on the discovery screen were Guinea Pigs, The Victim, Elevator, A Night Of Nightmares, Sawney: Flesh Of Man, Errors of the Human Body, May I Kill U?, Kill Zombie, Nightmare Factory, Before Dawn, Remnants, Wrong Turn 4: Bloody Beginnings, We Are the Night, The Inside, Community, and Guinea Pigs.The films shown on the new re-discovery screen were Inbred (with live audio commentary), The Arrival of Wang, Crawl, The Mummy's Shroud, Rasputin, the Mad Monk, The Devil Rides Out, and Bride of Frankenstein. This screen also hosted additional showings of We Are the Night, Sawney: Flesh of Man, Guinea Pigs, May I Kill U?, and The Inside, which had screened on the discovery screen.

 October 
The Halloween All-Nighter was held on 27 October 2012 at Leicester Square. The films shown were Bait 3D, Gallowalkers, Zombie Flesh Eaters, Excision, The Tall Man, and The Helpers.

FF2013
The fourteenth FrightFest took place at the Empire, Leicester Square during the Bank Holiday weekend, running from Thursday, August 22 to Monday, 26 August 2013. People who attended the Sleepy Queue was able to watch a preview screening of The Conjuring, with a video introduction by director James Wan. The festival's opening film was The Dead 2: India and the closing film was Big Bad Wolves; the closing film was the last one to ever screen on Empire, Leicester Square Screen 1, as it was closed the next day to be split into smaller screens. This year marked the addition of another screen, the "Extra Screen", which hosted additional screenings of any sell out titles. The prior year's Re-Discovery screen was not brought back in favor of a second Discovery screen. This year's Variety Spotlight interview was with director Ben Wheatley.

The films shown on the Main Screen were The Dead 2: India, Curse of Chucky, You're Next, The Dyatlov Pass Incident, Dementamania, Hatchet III, Haunter, V/H/S/2, 100 Bloody Acres, The Hypnotist, Frankenstein's Army, Hammer of the Gods, No One Lives, R.I.P.D., Cheap Thrills, Missionary, In Fear, The Grief Tourist, The Conspiracy, The Last Days, I Spit On Your Grave 2, Dark Touch, Banshee Chapter, Odd Thomas, We Are What We Are, and Big Bad Wolves. Also shown on the main screen were Andy Nyman's Quiz From Hell 4 and the 666 Short Film Awards.

Films shown on the Discovery Screens were For Elisa, Daylight, Sadik 2, Outpost: Rise of the Spetsnaz, Paranormal Diaries: Clophill, Wake in Fright, The American Scream, Hansel & Gretel: The 420 Witch, Antisocial, Painless, Wither, Snap, The Demon's Rook, Stalled, Cannon Fodder, Rewind This!, The Borderlands, On Tender Hooks, Bring Me the Head of the Machine Gun Woman, Contracted, The Desert, Willow Creek, House Of Usher, Nosferatu, Corruption, and an episode of Holliston.

 October event 
This year's Frightfest Halloween All-Nighter was held on Saturday 26 October 2013 at the Vue Cinemas in Leicester Square. The films shown were Soulmate, Patrick, Discopath, Mark of the Devil, The Station, and Nothing Left to Fear.

FF2014
The fifteenth FrightFest ran from Thursday 21 through Monday 25 August 2014 and took place at the Vue Cinemas in Leicester Square, London, where the prior year's Halloween All Nighter had been held. This move allowed the festival to offer three main screens, each of which would rotate the same films over morning and evening slots. Passes for the vent went on sale on 28 June 2014 and anyone who queued early in the "sleepy queue" on 27 June in person would be allowed to watch a free preview screening of the film Alien Abduction.

Films shown on the Main Screens were The Guest, Sin City: A Dame to Kill For, Zombeavers, Shockwave Darkside, The Green Inferno, Late Phases, Dead Snow: Red vs. Dead, The Last Showing, Housebound, All Cheerleaders Die, Starry Eyes, The Harvest, I Survived A Zombie Holocaust, The Babadook, Life After Beth, Among the Living, Faults, Open Windows, Home, The Samurai, Stage Fright, Xmoor, Nymph, Alleluia, V/H/S: Viral, and The Signal.

Films shown on the Discovery Screens were Honeymoon, Preservation, Julia, The Forgotten, The Canal, WolfCop, Wolf Creek 2, Wrong Turn 6, R100, Exists, The Den, The Drownsman, Dead Within, White Settlers, Digging Up The Marrow, Creep, Bad Milo!, The Sleeping Room, The Mirror, Coherence, Expedition, Drew: The Man Behind The Poster, Doc of the Dead, Lost Soul - The Doomed Journey Of Richard Stanley's Island of Dr. Moreau, The House at the End of Time, The Visitor, A Nightmare on Elm Street, Nekromantik, The Shining, Another, Altergeist, Lemon Tree Passage, Truth Or Dare, The Remaining, Deadly Virtues: Love.Honour.Obey., Blood Moon, and Extraterrestrial.

The Discovery Screen also hosted the Short Film Showcases and several The Duke at FrightFest events.

FF2015

The sixteenth FrightFest was once again held at the Vue Cinemas in Leicester Square and ran from Thursday 27 - Monday 31 August 2015. This year the festival added a third Discovery Screen.

Films shown on the Main Screens were Cherry Tree, Turbo Kid, Stung, Hellions, Landmine Goes Click, The Diabolical, JeruZalem, We Are Still Here, Demonic, Shut In, Bait, Frankenstein, Some Kind Of Hate, Rabid Dogs, Deathgasm, Slumlord, Road Games, Inner Demon, Scherzo Diabolico, A Christmas Horror Story, Curve, Night Fare, Nina Forever, Emelie, and Tales of Halloween.

Films shown on the Discovery Screens were Pod, Wind Walkers, Worry Dolls, Aaaaaaaah!, Never Let Go, Bloodsucking Bastards, The Rotten Link, The Entity, III, Final Girl, The Sand, Afterdeath, The Unfolding, Body, The Shelter, Zombie Fight Club, Future Shock! The Story Of 2000AD, The Nightmare, Estranged, The Hallow, Sun Choke, Night Of The Living Deb, Hangman, Another Me, The Tenderness Of Wolves, Madman, The Mutilator, Contracted: Phase II, Duke Mitchell - Remake, Remix, Rip-Off, Over Your Dead Body, These Final Hours, Most Likely To Die, Summer Camp, They Look Like People, Captain Kronos – Vampire Hunter, Hawk the Slayer, Your Vice Is a Locked Room and Only I Have the Key, Hellraiser, The Reflecting Skin, The Lesson, Howl, Awaiting, Goddess Of Love, The Lazarus Effect, Suspension, Last Girl Standing, Banjo, Hostile, Bite, and Curtains.

The Discovery Screen also hosted the Short Film Showcases, The Duke at Frightfest Film Party, and several panel discussions.

FF 2016

Due to refurbishment works at the previous venue, for 2016 FrightFest moved to Vue Cinemas, Shepherd's Bush, London. In addition to the change of venue it was announced that for 2016 FrightFest would include the entire 12 screen cinema as a venue for the first time. After several years of sponsorship by Film4 the organisers also revealed a new title sponsor was due to be announced. As with previous years, the festival maintained the three main screen format, each screen known by the name of an individual sponsor (Horror Channel Screen, Arrow Video Screen and Splice Media Screen) and again each film was rotated between the three screens at different times to allow invited guests and introductions to be given on each screen. There were, once again, three Discovery screens.

Thursday

Main Screen: My Father Die, Cell, Let Her Out

Friday

Main Screen: House on Willow Street, The Chamber, Mercy, They Call Me Jeeg Robot, Pet, White Coffin

Discovery Screen One: Through the Shadow, Enclosure, Ibiza Undead, Night of Something Strange, The Devil's Candy

Discovery Screen Two: Francesca, Another Evil, Population Zero, Benavidez's Case, The Similars

Discovery Screen Three: Road Games, Hostage to the Devil, Lost Solace, The Unraveling, special surprise screening (The Girl With all the Gifts)

Saturday

Main Screen: The Rezort, Abattoir, The Master Cleanse, Sadako vs. Kayako, Beyond the Gates, Blood Feast

Discovery Screen One: Short Film Showcase One, Attack of the Lederhosen Zombies, Offensive, The Love Witch, Knucklebones

Discovery Screen Two: Cruel Summer, House of Salem, The Creature Below, The Unkindness of Ravens, Hallow's Eve, The Corpse series

Discovery Screen Three: Fortitude (season 2, episode 1), Fury of the Demon, Beyond the Walls, Karaoke Zombies, the Duke Mitchell party event

Sunday

Main Screen: Downhill, Johnny Frank Garret's Last Word, Broken, Realive, 31

Discovery Screen One: Short Film Showcase Two, Let's Be Evil, Egomaniac, Crow, Bab Blood: The Movie

Discovery Screen Two: Facing His Fears: David McGillivray, Blood Feast, SiREN, The Neighbour

Discovery Screen Three: Beware the Moon book launch, horror writing master class with James Moran, Women in Genre panel, Special FX demonstration, The Future of British Horror

Monday

Main Screen: The Windmill Massacre, Monolith, Director's Cut, Red Christmas, Train to Busan

Discovery Screen One: Short Film Showcase Three, We Are the Flesh, Blood Hunters

Discovery Screen Two: The Killing of America, Paranormal Drive, Here Alone, The Evil in Us

Discovery Screen Three: Under the Shadow, Man Underground, Shelley, Found Footage 3D

 FF 2017 
In 2017, FrightFest returned to central London from 24 to 28 August for its eighteenth anniversary with sixty five feature films across two venues, Cineworld Leicester Square and The Prince Charles Cinema. The line-up included twenty world, twenty-two European and eighteen UK Premieres. Fourteen countries were represented spanning five continents, reflecting the current global popularity of the genre.

Thursday

Horror Channel Screen and Arrow Video Screen: Cult of Chucky, Death Note, PsychopathsCineworld Discovery Screen: Redwood, DianeFriday

Horror Channel Screen and Arrow Video Screen: Freehold, Sequence Break, Radius, 68 Kill, Leatherface, Dead ShackCineworld Discovery Screen: The Glass Coffin, Bad Match, Mindhack, Our Evil, Freddy/Eddy, VeronicaSplice Media Screen 1: Voice from the Stone, Short Film Showcase, Dhogs, King Cohen: The Wild World of Filmmaker Larry Cohen, Fanged UpSpice Media Screen 2: It Stains the Sands Red, Fashionista, Exhume, Nightworld, AccountableSaturday

Horror Channel Screen and Arrow Video Screen: The Bar, Alone, Jackals, Attack Of The Adult Babies, Victor Crowley, Game of DeathCineworld Discovery Screen: 3rd Night, Mansfield 66/67, Diane, Ruin Me, The Glass Coffin, Death Laid an EggSplice Media Screen 1: Mountain Fever, Boots on the Ground, To Hell and Back: The Kane Hodder Story, Where The Skin Lies, Eat Locals, CanariesSpice Media Screen 2: Return of the Living Dead III, Inside, The Movie Crypt Podcast, Redwood, Cold Hell, The Duke Mitchell Film Party!Sunday

Horror Channel Screen and Arrow Video Screen: Killing Ground, The End?, Double Date, Mayhem, The VillainessCineworld Discovery Screen: Bad Match, Mindhack, Our Evil, Ruin Me, Freddy/EddySplice Media Screen 1: Devil's Gate, Incontrol, Replace, Imitation GirlSpice Media Screen 2: Short Film Showcase 2, Demons Of The Mind, Blood From The Mummy's Tomb, In Conversation with Kane Hodder, Dream DemonMonday

Horror Channel Screen and Arrow Video Screen: Still/Born, Lowlife, Better Watch Out. The Terror of Hallow's Eve, Tragedy GirlsCineworld Discovery Screen: Veronica, 3rd Night, Mansfield 66/67, Screen International Genre Rising Star Award

Spice Media Screen 2: Short Film Showcase 3, Crow's Blood, Top Knot Detective, Meatball Machine Kodoku(No Splice Media Screen 1 on Monday)

 FF 2018 

In 2018, Arrow Video FrightFest returned to central London from 23 to 27 August.  In its nineteenth year, seventy feature films were shown across two venues, Cineworld Leicester Square and The Prince Charles Cinema.

Thursday

Arrow Video and Horror Channel Screens: The Ranger, Summer of '84, Mega Time SquadCineworld Discovery Screen: Bad Samaritan, Halloween (1978)Friday

Arrow Video and Horror Channel Screens: The Cleaning Lady, Braid, Puppet Master: The Littlest Reich, The Most Assassinated Woman in the World, Incident in a Ghost Land, BoarCineworld Discovery Screen: Out House, A Bluebird in my Heart, Short Film Showcase 1, Pimped, Dead Night, Crystal EyesPrince Charles Discovery Screen 1: FrightFest: Beneath the Dark Heart of Cinema, A Young Man with High Potential, St Agatha, One Cut of the Dead, Blue SunshinePrince Charles Discovery Screen 2: Seeds, Final Stop, Piercing, Rock Steady Row, LifechangerSaturday

Arrow Video and Horror Channel Screens: Ravers, Heretiks, Chuck Steel: Night of the Trampires, What Keeps you Alive, Upgrade, Fright FestCineworld Discovery Screen: Killing God, The Arrow Video Podcast, The LaPlace's Demon, Seeds, ***Prince Charles Discovery Screen 1: Mannequins + Book of Monsters, CRTL, The Devil's Doorway, F.U.B.A.R., Perfect Skin, The Duke Mitchell Film Club!Prince Charles Discovery Screen 2: The Tokoloshe, One Cut of the Dead, Halloween, Bad Samaritan, Life After Flash, LassoSunday

Arrow Video and Horror Channel Screens: Hell is Where the Home Is, The Man who Killed Hitler and then the Bigfoot, He's Out There, Terried (Aterrados), Anna and the ApocalypseCineworld Discovery Screen: The Nights Eats the Night, Luciderina, Hammer Horror: The Warner Bros. Year, VideoMan, The Night SitterPrince Charles Discovery Screen 1: Short Film showcase 2, White Chamber, Bodied, Await Further Instructions, Tigers are not AfraidPrince Charles Discovery Screen 2: Life Changer, Ghost Stories with Live commentary, Ghost Mask Scar, Piercing, Cult of TerrorMonday

Arrow Video and Horror Channel Screens: Open 24 hours, The Field Guide to Evil, The Dark, The Golem, ClimaxCineworld Discovery Screen: Secret Santa, The Witch in the Window, Frankenstein's Creature, Screen International Genre Rising Star Award presentation.

Prince Charles Discovery Screen 1: Wolfman got Nards, Short Film Showcase 3, Possum, Black SitePrince Charles Discovery Screen 2: Rock Steady Row, Crystal Eyes, The Tokoloshe October 
This year's annual FrightFest Halloween movie marathon took place during the day, a departure from the prior all night marathons. The films screened were Reborn, Parallel, Mara, Peripheral, The Unthinkable, and Abrakadabra.

 FF 2019 

In 2019, Arrow Video FrightFest returned in its 20th year to Cineworld and Prince Charles Cinemas on Leicester Square, from 22 to 26 August.

Thursday

Cineworld Leicester Square Arrow Video and Horror Channel Screens: Come to Daddy, Crawl, Scary Stories to Tell in the DarkCineworld Leicester Square Discovery Screen: Rock, Paper and Scissors, I Am ToxicFriday

Cineworld Leicester Square Arrow Video and Horror Channel Screens: Dark Encounter, Cut Off, Knives and Skin, Kindred Spirits, Bliss, Bullets of JusticeCineworld Leicester Square Discovery Screen: Dachra, Impossible Crimes, Blood & Flesh: The Reel Life & Ghastly Death Of Al Adamson, Sadistic Intentions, The Deeper You Dig, FingersPrince Charles Cinema Discovery One: The Wind, Girl on the Third Floor, To Your Last Death, Dario Argento Interview/Signing Event, Harpoon, PornoPrince Charles Cinema Discovery Two: Haunt, Red Letter Day, Tenebrae, The Dark Pictures' Man Of Medan, Freaks, Mutant BlastSaturday

Cineworld Leicester Square Arrow Video and Horror Channel Screens: Mary, Ghost Killers Vs. Bloody Mary, Feedback, The Drone, Madness In The Method, Why Don’t You Just Die!Cineworld Leicester Square Discovery Screen: I'll Take Your Dead, True Fiction, Extracurricular, Halloween Party, VolitionPrince Charles Cinema Discovery One: Death of A Vlogger, A Serial Killer's Guide to Life, Criminal Audition, Dark Sense, Are We Dead Yet, Duke Mitchell Film PartyPrince Charles Cinema Discovery Two: Arrow Video Podcast, Short Film Showcase 1, The Dark Red, Critters Attack!, Happy Face, I Trapped the DevilSunday

Cineworld Leicester Square Arrow Video and Horror Channel Screens: Spiral, Eat Brains Love, Daniel Isn't Real, Ready Or Not, NekrotronicCineworld Leicester Square Discovery Screen: The Furies, Stalked, The Magnificent Obsession Of Michael Reeves, Master Of Dark Shadows, The SonataPrince Charles Cinema Discovery One: Depraved, Witches In The Woods, Dark Light, Darlin', BloodlinePrince Charles Cinema Discovery Two: Fresh Blood Initiative, From Page To Scream, Short Film Showcase 2, Rabid (1977), The Legend of The Stardust BrothersMonday

Cineworld Leicester Square Arrow Video and Horror Channel Screens: The Black String, Satanic Panic, Tales From The Lodge, Rabid, A Good Woman Is Hard To FindCineworld Leicester Square Discovery Screen: Deadcon, Driven, The Barge People, Screen International Awards

Prince Charles Cinema Discovery One: For We Are Many, The Wretched, The Banana Splits Movie, StairsPrince Charles Cinema Discovery Two: Short Film Showcase 3, The Perished, Here Comes HellFF 2020
Due to the Coronavirus pandemic in the United Kingdom, the decision was made to have Arrow Video Fright Fest take place entirely online. The online event was held from 27 August to 31 August 2020, with a second digital festival from 21 October to 25 October 2020 for their Halloween festival.

The films for the August event were Sky Sharks, There's No Such Thing as Vampires, 12 Hour Shift, I Am Lisa, Triggered, The Columnist, The Horror Crowd, Blind, Don't Click, The Honeymoon Phase, Playhouse, They're Outside, Dark Place, Skull: The Mask, Hail to the Deadites, Hall, A Ghost Waits, Clapboard Jungle: Surviving the Independent Film Business, Two Heads Creek, Aquaslash, AV The Hunt, Dark Stories, Enhanced, Blinders, and The Swerve.The films for the October event were Held, The Sinners, The Banishing, Sacrifice, Stranger, Dead, The Brain That Wouldn't Die, Dangerous to Know, The Reckoning, The Owners, Babysitter Must Die, Spare Parts, The Pale Door, Woman of the Photographs, Tailgate, Butchers, Breeder, The Returned, Don't Look Back, Concrete Plans, Relic, Let's Scare Julie, For the Sake of Vicious, Broil, and Blood Harvest.

 FF 2021 
The twenty-second August London FrightFest event was held at Leicester Square from 26 through 30 August 2021.

The films shown on the main screen were Demonic, The Kindred, Crabs!, Brain Freeze, The Show, The Exorcism of Carmen Farias, Coming Home in the Dark, The Changed, Broadcast Signal Intrusion, Dawn Breaks the Eyes, The Last Thing Mary Saw, Sweetie You Won’t Believe it, Offseason, Prisoners of Ghostland, The Maid, King Knight, Sound of Violence, Gaia, Evie, No Man of God, The Retaliators, Slapface, Ultrasound, The Advent Calendar, and The Sadness.

Films shown on the discovery screens were Motherly, The Brilliant Terror, Shadow of the Cat, Night Drive, Hotel Poseidon, Red Snow, Pretty Boy, Isolation, Beyond the Infinite Two Minutes, Followers, Laguna Ave, The Parker Sessions, Bad Candy, The Unburied, Captive, Boy#5, Are We Monsters, The Last Rite, When the Screaming Starts, Bring Out the Fear, Censor, John and the Hole, Bloodthirsty, Forgiveness, Killer Concept, Woodlands: Dark and Days Bewitched, Post Mortem, Nocturna: Side A – The great Old Man’s Night, As In Heaven, So On Earth, Knocking, Greywood’s Plot, Mystery Spot, Antidote, She Watches From the Woods,  and The Found Footage Phenomenon.The Halloween event ran from Friday 28 through Saturday 30 October and was also held at Leicester Square. The films shown were The Seed, Barbarians, The Possessed, Pennywise: The Story of IT, Last Survivors, The Innocents, Amulet, Veneciafrenia, and Miracle Valley.

 FF 2022 
The twenty-third August FrightFest event was held at Leicester Square and will last from 25 to 29 August 2022.

The films shown on the main screen were The Lair, The Visitor from the Future, Scare Package II: Rad Chad’s Revenge, Next Exit, The Harbinger, A Wounded Fawn, Night Sky, Final Cut, Midnight Peepshow, Something in the Dirt, She Came from the Woods, Lola, Dark Glasses, Candy Land, Deadstream, Mastemah, Incredible but True, H4Z4RD, Wolf Manor, The Price We Pay, Piggy, Terrifier 2, Burial, Barbarian, and Fall.

The films shown on the discovery screens were B*tch a**, Croc!, Splinter, The Eyes Below, Pussycake, The Summoned, Tiny Cinema, The Ones You Didn’t Burn, They Wait in the Dark, Hypochondriac, Raven’s Hollow, Everyone Will Burn, Mean Spirited, Cult of VHS, Holy S**t!, Swallowed, The Ghosts of Monday, Sissy, Sorry About the Demon, Everybody Dies by the End, The Breach, Hounded, Orchestrator of Storms, Wreck, Eating Miss Campbell, Cerebrum, The Group, The Devil’s Hour, Walking Against the Rain, Bite, The Duke Mitchell Film Party, Dog Soldiers, Control, Torn Hearts, Follow Her, Huesera, Powertool Cheerleaders Vs. The Boyband of the Screeching Dead, Deep Fear, Daughter, Night of the Bastard, Who Invited Them, The Leech, Keeping the British End Up!, The Last Client, Super Z, The Creeping, Do Not Disturb, Wolfkin, Family Dinner, The Ghost Writer, Stalker, Living With Chucky, New Religion, The Once and Future Smash, and End Zone 2.

 Glasgow Festival Line-ups 
Starting in 2006, FrightFest has held a yearly film festival in Glasgow as part of the Glasgow Film Festival.

 FF Glasgow 2006 The Red Shoes (replaced The Great Yokai War), Bunshinsaba, Reeker, Wild Country with cast and crew, Boy Eats Girl FF Glasgow 2007 The Tripper, S & Man, The Messengers, Turistas, Motel Hell.

 FF Glasgow 2008 Grindhouse, Eden Log with Dir., REC with writer and Dir., The Cottage with cast, trailer for Beyond the Rave, faux grindhouse style trailers for Slash/Hive and Trannibal, Zombie Strippers FF Glasgow 2009 
The 2009 event took place over two days rather than the previous single day.

Friday: Dead Girl, Outlander, Walled InSaturday:Dorothy, I Sell the Dead, Grace, The Unborn, One Eyed Monster FF Glasgow 2010 
Friday: Frozen, Black Death Preview, 2001 Maniacs: Field of Screams, Stag NightSaturday: A Lizard in a Woman's Skin, Amer, [REC] 2, never-before-seen footage of Doghouse, Centurion Preview, Splice, Harpoon: Reykjavik Whale Watching Massacre FF Glasgow 2011 
Friday: Little Deaths, I Saw the Devil, Machete Maidens UnleashedSaturday: Rubber, Territories, The Shrine, Mother's Day, Hobo With A Shotgun FF Glasgow 2012 
FrightFest Glasgow took place on Friday 24 and Saturday 25 February 2012 as part of the Glasgow Film Festival. Films started at 1.30PM on the Friday and 11AM on the Saturday, allowing for 3 more films to be shown than at the previous events.

Friday: Corman's World: Exploits of a Hollywood Rebel, Tape 407: The Mesa Reserve Incident, Crawl, The Day, War Of The DeadSaturday: Evidence, Penumbra, Rites of Spring, Wang's Arrival, Cassadaga (replaced The Devil Inside), The RaidAlso for the first time at the Glasgow Film Festival there was a FrightFest Extra strand running through the main festival, films screened were: Livid, The Reptile, The Plague of the Zombies, Dracula: Prince of Darkness FF Glasgow 2013 
FrightFest Glasgow took place on Friday 22 & Saturday 23 February 2013 as part of the Glasgow Film Festival.

Friday: The American Scream, Sawney: Flesh Of Man, The Lords of Salem, Byzantium, Detention of the DeadSaturday: Black Sabbath, Bring Me the Head of the Machine Gun Woman, The Bay, The ABCs of Death, AftershockSpecial guests for the weekend included: Eli Roth, Nicolás López, Lorenza Izzo, Neil Jordan, Gemma Arterton, Saoirse Ronan, Lee Hardcastle, Simon Rumley, Jake West and Lucy Clements.

Also during the 2 days all 7 episodes of the Norwegian TV series Hellfjord were screened, with episodes playing before selected films with cast & crew in attendance over the weekend.

 FF Glasgow 2014 
FrightFest Glasgow took place on Friday 28 February & Saturday 1 March 2014 as part of the Glasgow Film Festival.

Thursday: Director Ti West in conversation with Alan Jones

Friday: Savaged, Proxy, Wolf Creek 2, The Sacrament, Afflicted

Saturday: Video Nasties: Draconian Days, The Scribbler, Torment, Mindscape, Almost Human, KillersSunday: Repeat screenings at Cineworld Glasgow - Video Nasties: Draconian Days, Almost Human, The Sacrament, Wolf Creek 2, KillersSpecial guests for the weekend included: Ti West, Jorge Dorado, Joe Begos, Josh Ethier, Zack Parker, Jordan Barker, Jake West, Marc Morris, John Suits.

 FF Glasgow 2015 
FrightFest Glasgow took place from Thursday 26 February to Saturday 28 February 2015 as part of the Glasgow Film Festival.

Thursday: Eliza GravesFriday: The Atticus Institute, The Paper Round, The Hoarder, Wyrmwood, 88, BackmaskSaturday: Clown, Sei donne per l'assassino, The Woods Movie, De Behandeling, [REC] 4: Apocalipsis, There Are Monsters FF Glasgow 2016 
FrightFest Glasgow took place from Thursday 25 February to Saturday 27 February 2016 as part of the Glasgow Film Festival.

Thursday: The ForestFriday: The Hexecutioners, Anguish (2015 film), Pandemic, The Mind's Eye (film), PatchworkSaturday: The Wave, Southbound (2015 film), SPL2: A Time for Consequences, The Other Side of the Door (2016 film), Baskin (film), Martyrs (2015 film), The Devil's Candy FF Glasgow 2017 
FrightFest Glasgow took place from Thursday 23 February to Saturday 25 February 2017 as part of the Glasgow Film Festival.

Thursday: A Cure for Wellness, Phantasm: Remastered

Friday: The Warrior's Gate, It Stains the Sand Red, The Transfiguration, Shin Godzilla, Happy Hunting

Saturday: Cage Dive, Fashionista, Bloodlands, Detour, Raw, Hounds of Love, The Night of the Virgin FF Glasgow 2018 
FrightFest Glasgow took place from Thursday 1 March to Saturday 3 March 2018 as part of the Glasgow Film Festival.

Thursday: Ghost Stories, The Lodgers (cancelled due to weather)

Friday: The Wanderers: Quest of the Demon Hunter, Attack of the Bat Monsters, The Ravenous - Les affamés, Cold Skin, Primal RageSaturday: Errementari: The Blacksmith and the Devil, Pyewacket, Friendly Beast, Secret Santa, Tigers are not Afraid - Vuelven, Sixty Minutes to Midnight FF Glasgow 2019 
FrightFest Glasgow took place from Thursday 28 February to Saturday 2 March 2019 as part of the Glasgow Film Festival.

Thursday: Lords of ChaosFriday: Level 16, The Dead Center, Here Comes Hell, Black Circle, Dead Ant (aka Giant Killer Ants)

Saturday: The Rusalka (aka The Siren), Automata, Finale, The Witch: Part 1 The Subversion, Freaks, The Hoard FF Glasgow 2020 
FrightFest Glasgow took place from Thursday 5 March to Saturday 7 March 2020 as part of the Glasgow Film Festival.

Thursday: Synchronic, Death of a VloggerFriday: The Cleansing Hour + Cubicle + Live Forever, In the Quarry + Black Mass, Sea Fever + Simon Boswell, A Ghost Waits, The Mortuary CollectionSaturday: A Night Of Horror: Nightmare Radio (rescheduled to earlier due to technical issues), Zombie For Sale, Saint Maud, Butt Boy + Fatale Collective: Bleed, VFW, Anderson Falls FF Glasgow 2021 
FrightFest Glasgow took place on Friday 5 March and Saturday 6 March. Films shown were Run Hide Fight, The Old Ways, The Woman With Leopard Shoes, Special Delivery, Out of This World, Vicious Fun, American Badger, and Eye Exam.

 FF Glasgow 2022 
FrightFest Glasgow was held from Thursday 10 through Saturday 12 March at the Glasgow Film Theatre. The films shown were Night's End, Let The Wrong One In, A Cloud So High, Homebound, You Are Not My Mother,  Wyrmwood Apocalypse, Mandrake, The Ledge, Some Like It Rare, Monstrous, Freaks Out, and The Cellar.

Extra FrightFest Events

ABCs Of Death

FrightFest hosted a special preview screening of The ABCs of Death at Prince Charles Cinema, London on Thursday 18 April 2013. Special guests on the night were: Ben Wheatley, Lee Hardcastle, Jake West, Lucy Clements, Simon Rumley and Simon Boswell.

All Nighter
In 2006 FrightFest began an annual Halloween all night event in the Institute of Contemporary Arts.

2006: Gone, The Chumscrubber, Re-cycle, The Raven, Heartstopper.

Preceding the first all nighter the ICA and FrightFest conducted a double bill the week before. This was attended by Tom Savini. The films shown were Meet the Feebles and Creepshow.

2007: Diary of the Dead with George A. Romero, Planet Terror, Savage Streets, Frontier(s), Inside and Trailer Trash. Short film Far Out with Prod.

2008:
This year the event took on the format of the long passed Shock Around The Clock events.My Name Is Bruce, Hush, Gnaw, Clive Barkers Book of Blood, Surprise movie (Tom Shankland's The Children), Quiz, Escape from New York, Splinter, Pig Hunt, Andrew Nyman's Dead Set Video Diary and short movie Treevenge.

2009:
Took place at the ICA in London, on 31 October.Invitation Only, Survival of the Dead, Paranormal Activity, Wrong Turn 3: Left for Dead, Umbrage, and Carriers. The film Daybreakers was pulled from the all-nighter at the last minute.

2010:
The All Nighter event relocated to a larger screen in the basement of the Empire, Leicester Square for the first time and took place on Saturday, 30 October.Confessions, Altitude, The Silent House, Choose, Rare Exports: A Christmas Tale.  Due to technical problems two scheduled films didn't get shown: The Reef and Cannibal Girls - they were replaced on the night by Spiderhole and Devil.

2011: The 2011 All Nighter took place on Saturday 29 October at Vue Cinemas Leicester Square London

Special guests on the night included: Tom Six, Ilona Six, Laurence R. Harvey plus numerous other members of The Human Centipede 2 (Full Sequence) cast as well Dieter Laser, in character as Dr. Heiter. Also in attendance were Bad Meat star Jessica Parker Kennedy and screenwriter Paul Gerstenberger.

Bad Meat, Livid, The Human Centipede 2 (Full Sequence), Faces in the Crowd, Cold Sweat, The Watermen

The All Nighter also took place at Watershed Bristol on Friday 4 November

Bad Meat, Faces in the Crowd, The Human Centipede 2 (Full Sequence), The Watermen, Cold Sweat

2012: The 2012 London All Nighter took place on Saturday 27 October at Vue Cinemas Leicester Square London. Director Pascal Laugier was in attendance to introduce his film The Tall Man, there was also a special presentation looking at the film The ABCs of Death.Excision, Gallowwalker, The Tall Man, Bait 3D, Zombi 2, The Helpers.

The All Nighter also took place at 4 additional venues around the country on Saturday 3 November. Watershed Bristol, Cambridge Picturehouse Cinemas, City of Sunderland Empire Cinemas and Newcastle upon Tyne Empire Cinemas2013: The 2013 London Halloween All Nighter took place on Saturday 26 October 2013 at Vue Cinemas Leicester Square London. Special guests for the night were: Sharni Vinson, Axelle Carolyn, Neil Marshall, Anna Walton, Renaund Gautheir and Michael Armstrong.

Soulmate, Patrick, Discopath, Mark of the Devil, The Station, Nothing left To Fear

The Out Of London All Nighters took place on Saturday 2 November: Glasgow, Basildon, Poole, Newcastle, Sunderland & Saturday 16 November: Bristol.

2014: The 2014 London Halloween All Nighter took place on Saturday 25 October 2014 at Prince Charles Cinema.Extraterrestrial, ABCs of Death 2, Last Shift, The Pact II, The Editor, and short films The Mad Axeman and Solitudo.

American Mary Cinema Tour 2013

FrightFest hosted a cinema tour to promote the film American Mary, the directors Soska sisters and lead actor Katharine Isabelle were present on the tour, introducing the film and taking part in post-show question and answer sessions at each screening.

Tour dates were: Friday 11 January Prince Charles Cinema, London. Saturday 12 January FilmHouse, Edinburgh. Sunday 13 January Glasgow Film Theatre. Monday 14 January Sheffield, Showroom. Tuesday 15 January Leeds, Hyde Park Picturehouse. Wednesday 16 January Bristol, Watershed. Thursday 17 January Brighton, Duke Of York. Friday 18 January Prince Charles Cinema, London.

An evening with Jessica Alba
The UK premiere of The Eye 2008 remake. Film was shown in the screening room of One Aldwych. Jessica Alba introduced the movie, stayed for a Q&A session and signed memorabilia.

Black Death World Premiere
On 26 May 2010, FrightFesters and horror fans alike were lucky enough to attend the World Premiere of Chris Smith's Black Death, courtesy of Revolver Entertainment. The event was held at the Coronet Cinema in Notting Hill, with Cast and Crew in attendance.

Brighton
FrightFest also featured as part of Brighton's Cinecity festival.

CineCity 2004 Creep with Dir. Christopher Smith, The Last Horror Movie with Dir. Julian Richards

CineCity 2005 Masters of Horror: Jenifer, Boo, District 13. At this event a FrightFester showed their FrightFest original eye logo tattoo.

CineCity 2006 Gone, The Raven, Vampire Diaries with director and cast.

D-Day with Neil Marshall
A day at the OWE dedicated to director Neil Marshall. Dog Soldiers, The Descent and Doomsday were all screened with introductions by Marshall. Question and answer sessions followed each movie. In attendance were Neil Marshall, Sean Pertwee, Darren Morfitt, Chris Robson, Leslie Simpson, Shauna MacDonald, Saskia Mulder, Alex Reid, MyAnna Buring, Nora Jane Noone, Alexander Siddig and Axelle Carolyn
An exclusive to the event poster was designed by Graham Humphreys and was exceptionally limited.

Cold in July
FrightFest hosted a free preview screening of Cold in July at Vue Cinemas, West End, London, on Monday 23 June 2014. The screening was attended by director Jim Mickle who introduce the film and took part in a post screening Q&A.

Dario Argento at the Coronet
19 April 2008 at the Coronet Cinema, Notting Hill, London. Dario Argento introduced his latest film, The Mother of Tears. Also showing as part of the day were Cannibals – Welcome to the Jungle and an encore screening of Storm Warning.

Descent premiere
In 2005 FrightFest helmed a gala preview of The Descent attended by Dir. Neil Marshall and the cast. The event was held at The Vue Cinema Leicester Square.

Drag Me to Hell with Sam Raimi
Frightfest, in conjunction with the ICA and Lionsgate, played host to the first UK showing of Drag Me to Hell. In attendance were Sam Raimi, Justin Long and Alison Lohman.

Hostel Day
March 2006. A one-off event once more at the PCC. Built around an early showing of Eli Roth's Hostel with two films chosen by Roth.Death Trance, The Wicker Man with pre-recorded intro' by Eli Roth, Mortuary, Hostel with pre-recorded Eli Roth intro, Theatre of Blood introduced by Kim Newman.

Iron Sky: Dictator's Cut

FrightFest hosted a screening of Iron Sky Dictator's Cut at the Prince Charles Cinema on Saturday 1 February 2014. Special guests attending were director Timo Vuorensola and producer Tero Kaukomaa.

League of Gentlemen Day
One day event returning to the PCC held in May 2005. A day built around the audience premiere of The League of Gentlemen's movie debut. The day started with a film selected by a League member. It also saw the audience premiere of Rob Zombie's The Devil's Rejects.From Beyond the Grave introduced by Mark Gatiss, R-Point, Shallow Ground, The League of Gentlemen's Apocalypse with Jeremy Dyson; Reece Shearsmith and Steve Pemberton, Neil Marshall and Nora Jane Noone with a sneak preview trailer of The Descent, Sin City (another surprise movie), The Devil's Rejects.

Lionsgate Horrorthon
Event run in conjunction with Lionsgate. The 70-seat screen at the Rex Bar in London's Soho means that audience attendance is allotted by competition.

2007 Saw III screening of extended edition, Blood Trails with star Rebecca Palmer, Snuff-Movie.

2008 Saw IV screening of extended edition, Catacombs, Bug and 20 min preview of Five Across The Eyes.

Oculus

FrightFest hosted a free preview screening of Oculus at Prince Charles Cinema, London, on Wednesday 4 June 2014.

On Tour
FrightFest has held one-off days across the UK.

Nottingham - The Broadway Cinema 2004 Dawn of the Dead, The Machinist, The Last Horror Movie, Monster ManLeicester - The Phoenix Arts Centre 2004 The Machinist, Creep with Dir. Christopher Smith, Monster ManCambridge 2004 Bubba Ho-tep, The Locals, The Last Horror Movie, Blueberry.

Cambridge 2005 R-Point, Shallow Ground, The Devil's Rejects, Dead Meat.

Cambridge 2007 End of the Line, Hell's Ground, The Abandoned, All The Boys Love Mandy Lane, Motel Hell.

The Raid 2

FrightFest hosted a special free preview screening of The Raid 2: Berandal at Cineworld Haymarket, London, on Tuesday 1 April 2014. The screening was attended by director Gareth Evans and stars Iko Uwais and Yayan Ruhian, who also staged a demonstration fight during the post-screening Q&A. Tickets were given away free and were all allocated in 20-minutes.

Spring Awakening Day 2009
Frightfest returned to the Prince Charles Cinema for a one-day event.Embodiment Of Evil, Shuttle, Repo! The Genetic Opera with director Darren Lynn Bousman, Lesbian Vampire Killers world audience premiere with director Phil Clayton with actress MyAnna Buring and the rest of the female cast members, Not Quite Hollywood, Turkey Shoot.

Storage24

FrightFest hosted a free preview screening of the film Storage 24 on Tuesday 26 June 2012 at Cineworld Haymarket, London. The screening was attended by director Johannes Roberts and lead actor Noel Clarke.

Video Nasties: Draconian Days Documentary

FrightFest hosted the London Premiere of Nucleus Films documentary Video Nasties: Draconian Days at Prince Charles Cinema on Thursday 3 July 2014 at 8.30PM. The event was hosted by Paul McEvoy and feature a post screening Q&A with director Jake West, Marc Morris, Alan Jones, David Flint and Julian Petley.

Blogs
Regular blogs are now a feature of the festival's website. They began with The Alan Jones Diary and a guide to DVDs Gore in the Store. Recently it has grown to include more blogs which cover Video Games, TV, the Australian horror scene, foreign language genre fare, HD format releases, Memorabilia and Comics.

The 2009 annual redesign of the website added two more blogs and a regular review blog from Alan Jones.

The organisers of the festival blog annually about their visits to the Cannes Film Festival and the Fantastic Fest in Austin Texas.

FrightFest Originals
Launched in August 2012, FrightFest Originals is a range of limited edition posters featuring new artwork for classic and modern feature films. Posters can be purchased through the dedicated FrightFest Originals online website or at FrightFest events.

FrightFest Presents
In 2005 a "FrightFest Presents" DVD label was created and briefly distributed Dead Meat, Malefique, Tears of Kali, Eyes of Crystal and The Roost within the UK.
The label was an imprint of Revolver Entertainment.
In 2015, the label was revived in cooperation with Icon Film Distribution. Films to be released from October 2015 are Night of the Living Deb, Some Kind of Hate, Last Girl Standing, AAAAAAAAH!, Afterdeath, Landmine goes click, Emelie, The Lesson, Estranged.

FrightFest Features
On 23 May 2011 FrightFest Features DVD label was launched, the first 2 DVDs released were both films that had previously played in the festival: Italian director Federico Zampaglione's 2007 film Shadow and the 2007 New Zealand action comedy The Devil Dared Me To. Films will be released theatrically and for home entertainment, the label is launched in conjunction with Wild Bunch.

Quiz
In 2005 the FrightFest quiz was introduced. The first quiz was spread over the weekend but was then streamlined. In 2007 the quiz was devised by Alan Jones and was remarked upon as being especially challenging. This quiz was conducted by British Horror institution David McGillivray.

2010 saw the introduction of Andy Nyman's Quiz from Hell, an audiovisual horror movie quiz projected on the massive Empire Screen 1. Hosted by Andy Nyman, the quiz saw several hundred horror fans answering questions from a range of categories including 'What happens next? - Guess the Death', Movie Monsters, horror soundtrack themes and trivia. The Quiz from Hell, with its opening horror movie montage, audiovisual clips and all questions, was put together by Simon Williams and Lee-Jay Bannister, the brains behind the London-based film-themed pub quiz You're Gonna Need A Bigger Boat. The quiz returned in 2011 as Andy Nyman's Quiz from Hell 2''.

Ticketing
Tickets are sold with the option of a weekend pass or individual tickets. 2007 saw the introduction of Day Passes. Weekend passes go on sale, typically, on 1 July each year with individual tickets on sale a month later. Tickets are bought online, by phone or in person.

Since 2005, a growing group have congregated in person to buy tickets for the festival. The start time of this queue has been earlier each year earning it the nickname "The Sleepy Queue".

Weekend pass holders are presented with a "goodie bag" of freebies. This is a mixture of promotional items and posters, badges, T-shirts and DVDs.

References

External links

FrightFest Originals Poster Website
Review of FrightFest 2004 at Eatmybrains.com
Kinoeye Review of FF 2002

Annual events in London
Fantasy and horror film festivals in the United Kingdom
Film festivals established in 2000
Film festivals in London
Science fiction film festivals